The Mauritania national badminton team represents Mauritania in international badminton team competitions. The Mauritanian team is controlled by the Mauritanian Badminton Federation, which is the governing body for Mauritanian badminton. Mauritania competes in badminton at the Pan Arab Games.

Participation in Pan Arab Games 
Mauritania made its badminton debut in the 1999 Pan Arab Games in Amman, Jordan where badminton was first contested in the Games. The national team have never entered the semifinals.

Men's team

Women's team

References 

Badminton
National badminton teams